Gabriel "Gabri" Veiga Novas (born 27 May 2002) is a Spanish professional footballer who plays as a central midfielder for La Liga club Celta Vigo.

Club career
Veiga was born in O Porriño, Pontevedra, Galicia, and was a RC Celta de Vigo youth graduate. He made his senior debut with the reserves at the age of 17 on 25 August 2019, starting in a 2–2 Segunda División B away draw against Internacional de Madrid.

Veiga scored his first goal on 1 December 2019, netting the opener in a 1–6 loss at CD Atlético Baleares. He made his first team – and La Liga – debut on 19 September of the following year, coming on as a late substitute for Renato Tapia in a 2–1 home win against Valencia CF.

Veiga scored his first professional goal on 10 September 2022, but in a 4–1 away loss against Atlético Madrid. The following 11 January, he was definitely promoted to the main squad, being assigned the number 24 jersey.

Career statistics

Club

Honours
Individual
La Liga Player of the Month: February 2023

References

External links
Profile at the RC Celta de Vigo website

2002 births
Living people
Spanish footballers
Footballers from O Porriño
Association football defenders
La Liga players
Primera Federación players
Segunda División B players
Celta de Vigo B players
RC Celta de Vigo players
Spain youth international footballers
Spain under-21 international footballers